Mangelia decaryi  is a species of sea snail, a marine gastropod mollusk in the family Mangeliidae.

Description
The length of the shell attains 13 mm, its diameter 4 mm.

This rather solid shell had a high spire with 8 convex whorls, separated by a distinct suture. The whorls in the protoconch  are smooth. The others show axial plicae that are a little arcuate and become sigmoid on the body whorl. The aperture is rather wide and lacks a siphonal canal at its base. The columella shows a callosity that becomes rather thick at the top. The outer lip is incrassate, bends off inwards and ends at the top into a large and deep sinus. The color of the shell is white, banded in the upper whorls by a series of brown spots between the axial plicae.

Distribution
This marine species occurs off Madagascar

References

External links
  Tucker, J.K. 2004 Catalog of recent and fossil turrids (Mollusca: Gastropoda). Zootaxa 682:1-1295.

decaryi
Gastropods described in 1932